Wish Ko Lang! is a Philippine television public service drama anthology show broadcast by GMA Network. Originally hosted by Bernadette Sembrano, it premiered on June 29, 2002 on the network's Saturday afternoon line up. The show concluded on February 15, 2020 with a total of 983 episodes. It was replaced by Ilaban Natin Yan! in its timeslot. The show returned on July 11, 2020. Vicky Morales currently serves as the host. 

The series is streaming online on YouTube.

Hosts

 Bernadette Sembrano 
 Vicky Morales

Accolades

References

External links
 
 

2002 Philippine television series debuts
Filipino-language television shows
GMA Network original programming
GMA Integrated News and Public Affairs shows
Philippine anthology television series
Television series revived after cancellation